Tanmay Dharamchand Agarwal (born 3 May 1995) is an Indian cricketer who plays for Hyderabad. A left-handed top-order batsman, Agarwal has represented Hyderabad at various age-group levels such as Under-14, Under-16, Under-19, Under-22 and Under-25. He scored centuries on both his first-class and List A cricket debuts for Hyderabad in 2014. He currently leads the Hyderabad Cricket team .

In February 2017, he was bought by the Sunrisers Hyderabad team for the 2017 Indian Premier League for 10 lakhs. In January 2018, he was bought by the Sunrisers Hyderabad in the 2018 IPL auction.

References

External links 
 
 

1995 births
Living people
Indian cricketers
Hyderabad cricketers
Cricketers from Hyderabad, India